Pádraig Ó Snodaigh (born 18 May 1935, Carlow, Ireland) is an Irish language activist, poet, writer and publisher. He worked for the Irish Electricity Supply Board, and later in the National Museum of Ireland. He is a former president of Conradh na Gaeilge, the Gaelic League.

From 1970 to 1973 he was co-editor with Mícheál Ó Bréartún of Pobal, an Irish language current affairs magazine. From 1974 to 1977, he was the editor of Carn, the official magazine of the Celtic League. In 1980, Ó Snodaigh founded the publishing company Coiscéim which has published nearly 1,500 books in Irish. In addition he has written poetry, novels, and historical essays. He co-edited three editions, with Tomás Mac Síomóin, of the political, philosophical and literary journal Lasair. He began a book series in 2006 focusing on reflections on 1916. The series is called, Macallai na Cásca, and there are 24 books in the series thus far.

One of his most famous books is Hidden Ulster, Protestants and the Irish language. Another noted book is Two Godfathers of Revisionism (1991), which contains a discussion of Eugene Kamenka's book on nationalism as well as a critique of the revisionist view of the 1916 Rising in Irish history. Ó Snodaigh argues against the views of this event made by Irish historians F.X. Martin and Francis Shaw (the "two godfathers" of the book's title), whom he claims are arguing from an anti-nationalist perspective.

He is married to the artist Cliodhna Cussen. His son  Aengus is a Sinn Féin TD. Three other sons, Rossa, Rónán, and Colm are in the band Kíla. His other sons are Cormac and Fergus who owned and operated a security firm for 20 years until 2004.

Irish Language Publications
 Comhghuaillithe na Réabhlóide 1913-1916. Dublin : An Clóchomhar, 1966.
 Paróiste an Fheirtéaraigh agus 1916 Eag. Pádraig Ó Snodaigh, Dublin : Scepter, 1968.
 Ua Rathghaille Dublin : Foilseachain Poblachtacha, 1970.
 Éireannaigh sa Chogadh Chathartha sna Stáit Aontaithe 1970
 An Cómhargadh Dublin : Pobal Teo, 1971.
 An Bealach Romhainn - léacht a tugadh in Áras an Chonartha faoi bhráid Choiste na Cathrach, Baile Átha Cliath, mí Márta, 1974 Dublin, Clódhanna Teo, 1974
 Litreacha oscailte le Pádraic Mac Piarais. Dublin : Club Chonradh na Gaeilge, i bpáirt le Clódhanna Teo, 1979.
 Caomhnú nó athréimniú - óráid an uachtaráin, a tugadh ag ardfheis Chonradh na Gaeilge i mBéal Átha na Slua, 19 Aibreán 1975  Dublin, Clódhanna Teo, 1975
 Rex: Dublin, Coiscéim, 1981.
 Véinéiseach Éigin:  aistrithe ag Pádraig Ó Snodaigh, Dublin, Carbad, 1983.
 Cumha agus Cumann: Aisling Design, Dublin, 1985.
 Solitudine e Compagnia/Cumha agus Cumann: poesie di Pádraig Ó Snodaigh a cura di Rosangela Barone e G. Lendaro Camiless, Bari - Edizioni dal Sud, Italy, 1986.
 Linda: Dublin, Coiscéim, 1987.
 Cúl le cúl : Dublin : Coiscéim, 1988.
 Eadar mi 's a' bhreug, Màiri NicGumaraid ; leaganacha Gaeilge, Pádraig Ó Snodaigh & Liam Prút. Coiscéim, 1988.
 Ó Pharnell go Queenie. Dublin : Coiscéim, 1991.
 Ceatharlach i 1798 : amharc ar na staraithe Dublin : Coiscéim thar ceann Cumann Oidhreachta Chontae Cheatharlach, 1991.
 An tAmhrán Éireannach : (i gcuimhne Bobby Sands).Conte, Guisseppe. (leagan gaeilge le Pádraig Ó Snodaigh).  Dublin : Coiscéim, 1991.
 Unshed Tears - Deora Nár Caoineadh, Áine Ní Ghlinn arna aistriú ag Pádraig Ó Snodaigh. Coiscéim/Dedalus Press, 2002.
 Ón Droichead go dtí an Duibheagán : Téamaí staire ón tréimhse Nollaig 1921 go tús Chogadh na gCarad. Coiscéim, 1997.
 Ruithmean's neo-rannan/Rainn agus neamhrainn, Màiri NicGumaraid ; leaganacha Gaeilge, Pádraig Ó Snodaigh & Liam Prút. Coiscéim, 1997.
 Dílseoirí na Gaillmhe - faoi airm agus éide 1798 roimhe agus ina dhiaidh:. Coiscéim, 1998.
 Len: - translated into Italian by Rosangela Barone, Faenza - Moby Dick, Italy, 1999.
 Vae Puero: athleaganacha ar dhánta le Pádraic Fiacc, arna aistriú ag Aogán Ó Muircheartaigh & Pádraig Ó Snodaigh. Coiscéim, 2002.
 Cronú: Dublin, Coiscéim, 2004.
 Macallaí na Cásca 4 - Na Priompalláin - 1916 agus athscríobh na staire, Dublin : Coiscéim, 2006.
 Macallaí na Cásca 9 - 1916 agus mar sin de, Dublin : Coiscéim, 2013.
 Smaointe Fánacha: D. Ó Maol Blagaide, Dublin, Coiscéim, 2013.
 Clamavi: Dublin, Coiscéim, 2014.
 Macallaí na Cásca 13 - Comhghuaillithe na Réabhlóide 1913-1916, Dublin : Coiscéim (ath-chló), 2016.
 Ag Druidim le 80 Dublin, Coiscéim, 2018.
 Scórscéalta Dublin, Coiscéim, 2020.

English Language Publications

 Ireland and the Common Market : a second Act of Union? Dublin : Common Market Study Group, 1972.
 Hidden Ulster. Dublin : Clodhanna Teo, 1973. (Revised editions appeared in 1977 and 1995).
 Modern literature in Irish : survival, revival, arrival, London : Connolly Association, c.1984.
 Irish Political Documents: 1916-1949, Blackrock : Irish Academic Press, 1985.
 Irish Political Documents, 1869-1916, Dublin : Irish Academic Press, 1989.
 Two Godfathers of Revisionism : 1916 in the Revisionist Canon, Dublin : Fulcrum Press, 1991.
 The Irish volunteers 1715-1793 : a list of the units, Blackrock, Co. Dublin : Irish Academic Press, 1995.

References

Irish language activists
1935 births
Living people
People from County Carlow
Celtic studies scholars
Irish-language writers